Cham Arab (also Romanized as Cham ‘Arab; also known as Cham ‘Arab-e Āsh‘abān) is a village in Holayjan Rural District, in the Central District of Izeh County, Khuzestan Province, Iran. At the 2006 census, its population was 24, in 6 families.

References 

Populated places in Izeh County